The Kenya Institute of Social Work and Community Development (KISWCD) is a community-focused development and training institution without any governmental, religious or political affiliation. It was registered by the Ministry of Education, Science and Technology on 22 August 2002 as a training institution. In 2016; in line with the TVET Act 2013, the institution was assessed and licensed to operate by TVETA Registration TVETA/PRIVATE/TVC/0120/2016.

The institute is managed by a Board of Governors who are experienced in the areas of social work, educational institutions management, business management, human resources management, finance and accounting, psychology, environmental health, counselling and law.

KISWCD is an examination centre for Kenya National Examination Council, the Institute of Commercial Management, CDAAC, the Association of Business Managers and Administrators among others. The institution offers certificate and diploma courses in Community Development, Social Work and Welfare, Project Management, Community Health and Counseling. Short courses and consultancy services are available. Students from Uganda, Tanzania, Mozambique, Sudan, Somalia and Ethiopia are among those who have enrolled in KISWCD. In the last 22 years, the institution has distinguished itself as a Centre of excellence; drawing students from virtually all major NGOs, Government departments and the Private sector. Foreign students from Uganda, Tanzania, Mozambique, Sudan, Somalia, Malawi and Ethiopia have continued to enroll in KISWCD signifying the confidence that the region has in the institution. Empowerment of the community through training and management is the basic foundation of the institute.

The main campus is located at Southern House, 2nd floor, off Moi Avenue opposite the Meridian Hotel, Nairobi.

Academics

Intake
KISWCD has intakes in January, May and September every year. Registration for the distance learning programme is possible throughout the year. Students can register online.

Mode of study
 Full-time (daytime)- 8.00 am – 6.00 pm, Mon – Fri
 Evening classes – 5.30 pm – 7.30 pm, Mon – Fri
 Saturday classes – 8.00 am – 4.00 pm
 Blocks – April, August, and December
 Distant Learning Programme (learning by correspondence)

Examinations
Examinations are administered by several examination bodies namely:
 Kenya National Examination Council (KNEC)
 Kenya Institute of Social Work and Community Development (KISWCD)
 Association of Business Managers and Administrators (ABMA UK)
 NITA
 CDAAC

The programmes evaluation and quality assurance is done by the Ministry of Education, Science and Technology, Commission for Higher Education, and individual institutions that collaborating with KISWCD.

Field work attachment
All students are required to get attachments in NGOs, churches and other organizations involved in community work for not less than three months. This takes place during the academic year and is a mandatory requirement.

Extracurricular
The institute sponsors an annual sports day where students and teachers play against each other.

Short courses
Short courses are organized at the beginning of each year. The institute links up with Kenya Institute of Social Work to offer training.

Accommodation
KISWCD does not offer in-house accommodation for students. However, arrangements are made to secure safe accommodation, with the cost met by the students.

Consultancy
The objective of the consultancy services is to provide advice in particular areas of expertise.

References

External links
 Kenya Institute of Social Work and Community Development KISWCD website
 Kenya Ministry of Education Ministry of Education website
 Kenya National Examination Council Examination Council website

Technical universities and colleges
Universities and colleges in Kenya
Education in Kenya
Educational institutions established in 1997
1997 establishments in Kenya